"Joy and Pain" is a song by hip-hop duo Rob Base and DJ E-Z Rock.

Charts

References

1988 singles
Rob Base & DJ E-Z Rock songs
1988 songs